Das siebente Jahr is an East German film. It was released in 1968.

External links
 

1968 films
East German films
1960s German-language films
Films whose director won the Heinrich Greif Prize
1960s German films